Krasninsky Uyezd (Краснинский уезд) was one of the subdivisions of the Smolensk Governorate of the Russian Empire. It was situated in the southwestern part of the governorate. Its administrative centre was Krasny.

Demographics
At the time of the Russian Empire Census of 1897, Krasninsky Uyezd had a population of 102,257. Of these, 90.0% spoke Belarusian, 8.7% Russian, 0.7% Yiddish, 0.4% Polish, 0.1% Romani and 0.1% German as their native language.

References

 
Uezds of Smolensk Governorate
Smolensk Governorate